Nana Ama Odame-Okyere is a Ghanaian beauty pageant winner who was appointed as Miss Earth Ghana 2014 that enabled her to represent Ghana at Miss Earth 2014.

Pageantry

Miss Earth Ghana
Nana Ama Odame-Okyere has been designated as "Miss Earth Ghana 2014" by the national director. The contest would be held early 2015 for the 15th edition of Miss Earth.

Miss Earth 2014

By being Miss Earth Ghana, Nana Ama flew to the Philippines in November to compete with almost 100 other candidates to be Alyz Henrich's successor as Miss Earth.

As a Miss Earth delegate, an environmental advocacy is must. When she was asked about her advocacy for the pageant, she answered, "I seek to advocate for safer small scale mining devoid of child labor." She explained her answer by saying that she is an indigent of Eastern Ghana. That the government of Ghana is undertaking the small scale of mining. However, despite of what the government does, there are still several people of different nationalities that are reported to commit illegal mining. The effect of that turns to boys and girls skipping schools to take part in that kind of mining. To her, the effect could be very alarming as it will be the cause of an excessive damage done to the environment.

As published in the Miss Earth website, when she was asked about what she can promote about her country, she replied, "I am very proud of my country Ghana. my country has the worlds largest artificial lake, it is bisected by the Greenwich Meridian and also endowed with so many natural mineral resources like gold, diamond, timber and bauxite. My country remains one of the most stable democracies in Africa, having successfully transferred power peacefully without records of violence. Africa has often been plagued with several pocket of conflicts, violence and civil strives, therefore coming from a country and overall political stability gives me a great pride. I can promote the several tourist site in my country, some of these man made site are the cape coast and eliminate castle . These precolonial heritages served as temporal holdings before they were transported out of Africa, we leaving their experiences would be great."

References

External links
Nana Ama Odame-Okyere at Miss Earth official website
Miss Earth Ghana 2014 Eco-Beauty Video
Miss Earth official website
Miss Earth Ghana official Facebook account

Living people
Miss Earth 2014 contestants
Ghanaian beauty pageant winners
1990s births